Mike Feinstein is an American politician and a member of the Green Party.  Feinstein has been involved in political activism since 1988, after he attended a conference at the Findhorn community in Scotland entitled "The Individual and the Collective: Politics as If The Earth Mattered". He first became active with the Westside Greens in the Santa Monica/West Los Angeles area in November 1988 and then joined his neighborhood Ocean Park Community Organization in early 1989. Feinstein is one of many co-founders of the Green Party of California (GPCA). He ran for Secretary of State of California in 2018.

Municipal Government

Between 1996 and 2004 he was elected twice to the City Council of Santa Monica, California and was appointed as its mayor from 2000-2002. Feinstein was first elected to the City Council in 1996 receiving 13,681 votes and finishing second amongst the thirteen candidates running for four seats. Feinstein was re-elected in 2000 with 21,084 votes, finishing first out of thirteen candidates for four seats. His vote total at the time being the second highest ever for any Santa Monica City Council candidate. In December 2000, Feinstein was appointed to a two-year term as mayor by a 7-0 vote of his colleagues. In 2004 Feinstein sought a third term but was unsuccessful, finishing 9th of 16. In 2014 Feinstein ran again and finished 8th of 13.

Other Governmental Experience

Feinstein has also served on the Southern California Association of Government's Energy & Environment Committee (1997–2004), Growth Visioning Task Force (2001–2004), Regional Comprehensive Plan Task Force (2004–2008) and Integrated Policy Task Force (2009–2010), as well as the Westside Council of Governments, Local Government Commission (California), California League of Cities, National League of Cities, U.S. Conference of Mayors and International Council for Local Environmental Initiatives (ICLEI).

Green Party roles and responsibilities

Feinstein has served in a variety of positions in the Green Party, on the local, county, state, national, international and global level. He's been elected to ten two-year terms (in ten tries) on the County Council of the Green Party of Los Angeles County since 1992, and served as its Co-Coordinator from 2005-2006. He has also served multiple terms on the party's state Coordinating Committee, and served as its Co-coordinator from 2006-2008 and has served as a state party spokesperson since 2011.

Feinstein was the founding and managing editor (1997–2001) of the national Green newspaper Green Pages, has been a GPCA delegate to the National Committee of the Green Party since 2007 and was a GPCA delegate to the 2000, 2004, 2008 and 2012 Green Party Presidential Nominating Conventions. In 2009 he was elected to a two-year term as one of seven co-chairs of the Green party of the United States.

Internationally, Feinstein has twice served (2001, 2008) as a GPUS delegate to Congresses of the Global Greens, the global network of Green parties and political movements. He was the founding webmaster of the Global Greens website in 2002 and today is its Content Development Manager.

Media/publishing

From 1989 to 1995, Feinstein was co-host of "Green Perspectives", on Pacifica Radio station KPFK, Los Angeles, which was created by the Green Radio Collective. In 1992, he edited a collection of European Greens writings, the 684-page "16 Weeks with European Greens: Interviews, Impressions, Platforms and Personalities." Feinstein's YouTube channel has a large collection of Green Party videos. Currently Feinstein writes a column called Inside/Outside on local politics for the Santa Monica Daily Press.

References

External links
Michael Feinstein's Home Page
Michael Feinstein's GPUS Steering Committee Profile

California Greens
Mayors of Santa Monica, California
Green Party of the United States chairs
American democracy activists
American environmentalists
Anti-corporate activists
Living people
Activists from California
Year of birth missing (living people)